The Southeast Asian Youth Athletics Championships is an annual athletics competition between youth athletes (under-18) from Southeast Asian nations which is organised by the Southeast Asian Athletics Association. The event, first held in 2006, was formerly known as the Southeast Asian Junior Championships, though entries have always been for under-18 athletes, rather than the international standard of "junior" signifying under-20 athletics.

The competition serves as a regional complement to the biennial, continental Asian Junior Athletics Championships. Since 2009, athletics has also been held for youths in the region at the annual ASEAN School Games. A separate ASEAN Schools Athletics Championships was first held in 1977.

Editions

References

External links
Official website 2012 (archived)

Under-18 athletics competitions
Athletics competitions in Asia
Youth sport in Southeast Asia
Recurring sporting events established in 2006
Annual sporting events
International athletics competitions
Asian youth sports competitions